Aminabad may refer to:

Pakistan
 Aminabad, a town in Punjab, Pakistan

India
 Aminabad, Lucknow, a market in Lucknow, India

Iran

Alborz Province
 Aminabad, Alborz, a village in Savojbolagh County

Ardabil Province
 Aminabad, Ardabil, a village in Nir County

East Azerbaijan Province
 Aminabad, Bostanabad, a village in Bostanabad County
 Aminabad, Tekmeh Dash, a village in Bostanabad County
 Aminabad, Charuymaq, a village in Charuymaq County

Fars Province
Aminabad, Fars, a village in Firuzabad County

Gilan Province
 Aminabad, Rasht, a village in Rasht County
 Aminabad, Rudbar, a village in Rudbar County

Golestan Province
 Aminabad, Golestan, a village in Aqqala County

Hamadan Province
 Aminabad, Chaharduli, a village in Asadabad County
 Aminabad, Darbandrud, a village in Asadabad County
 Aminabad, Famenin, a village in Famenin County
 Aminabad, Nahavand, a village in Nahavand County

Isfahan Province
 Aminabad, Mahmudabad, a village in Isfahan County
 Aminabad, Qahab-e Jonubi, a village in Isfahan County
 Aminabad, Shahreza, a village in Shahreza County

Kerman Province
 Aminabad, Anar, a village in Anar County
 Aminabad, Rudbar-e Jonubi, a village in Rudbar-e Jonubi County

Kermanshah Province
 Aminabad, Kermanshah, a village in Sahneh County

Khuzestan Province
 Aminabad, Khuzestan, a village in Behbahan County

Kurdistan Province
 Aminabad, Bijar, a village in Bijar County
 Aminabad, Divandarreh, a village in Divandarreh County
 Aminabad, Qorveh, a village in Qorveh County
 Aminabad, Serishabad, a village in Qorveh County

Markazi Province
 Aminabad, Markazi, a village in Khomeyn County

Mazandaran Province
 Aminabad, Babol, a village in Babol County
 Aminabad, Tonekabon, a village in Tonekabon County

North Khorasan Province
 Aminabad, Esfarayen, a village in Esfarayen County
 Aminabad, Maneh and Samalqan, a village in Maneh and Samalqan County

Qazvin Province
 Aminabad, Buin Zahra, a village in Qazvin Province, Iran
 Aminabad, Qazvin, a village in Qazvin Province, Iran
 Aminabad-e Now, a village in Qazvin Province, Iran
 Aminabad, alternate name of Qeshlaq-e Aminabad, a village in Qazvin Province, Iran
 Aminabad, alternate name of Suliqan, a village in Qazvin Province, Iran

Razavi Khorasan Province
 Aminabad, Firuzeh, a village in Firuzeh County
 Aminabad, Mashhad, a village in Mashhad County
 Aminabad, Rashtkhvar, a village in Rashtkhvar County
 Aminabad, Jangal, a village in Rashtkhvar County

Semnan Province
 Aminabad, Semnan, a village in Shahrud County

South Khorasan Province
 Aminabad, Khusf, a village in Khusf County
 Aminabad, Neh, a village in Nehbandan County

Tehran Province
 Aminabad, Firuzkuh, a village in Firuzkuh County
 Aminabad, Malard, a village in Malard County
 Aminabad, Shemiranat, a village in Shemiranat County
 Aminabad, Qarchak, a village in Qarchak County

West Azerbaijan Province
 Aminabad, Mahabad, a village in Mahabad County
 Aminabad, Piranshahr, a village in Piranshahr County
 Aminabad, Takab, a village in Takab County

Yazd Province
 Aminabad, Yazd, a village in Meybod County

Zanjan Province
 Aminabad, Mahneshan, a village in Mahneshan County
 Aminabad, Zanjan, a village in Zanjan County

Pakistan
 Aminabad, Gujranwala, a town in Gujranwala District, Punjab, Pakistan
 Aminabad, Sindh, a town in Hyderabad District, Sindh, Pakistan
 Aminabad, Liaqatpur, in Pakistan